Lost Patrol is a 1929 British silent war film directed by Walter Summers and starring Cyril McLaglen, Sam Wilkinson and Terence Collier. The film was made at Welwyn Studios by British Instructional Films. It was based on the 1927 novel Patrol by Philip MacDonald. It was remade in 1934 by John Ford.

Synopsis
During the First World War, a hard-pressed British patrol in the deserts of Mesopotamia come under attack from the enemy. Gradually they are picked off one by one.

Cast
 Cyril McLaglen as The Sergeant
 Sam Wilkinson as Sanders
 Terence Collier as Corporal Bell
 Arthur B. Woods as Lieutenant Hawkins
 Hamilton Keene as Morelli
 Fred Dyer as Abelson
 Charles Emerald as Hale 
 Andrew McMaster as Brown 
 James Watts as Cook 
 John Valentine as Mackay

References

Bibliography
 Low, Rachel. The History of British Film: Volume IV, 1918–1929. Routledge, 1997.

External links

1929 films
British war films
British silent feature films
1920s English-language films
Films directed by Walter Summers
World War I films set in the Middle East
Films set in Iraq
Films set in the 1910s
Films shot at Welwyn Studios
Films based on Patrol
British black-and-white films
Films set in the Ottoman Empire
1929 war films
1920s British films
Silent adventure films